The Adelaide Eagles American Football Club is a sporting club competing in the South Australian Gridiron Association league.

History
The Eagles first fielded a team in the 1986/87 season, which was the second year of competitive Gridiron in South Australia. The Eagles burst onto the scene with a 14–12 win over the Port Adelaide Spartans. On the way to a berth in the play-offs, they scored a historic 54–0 win over the Southern Long Horns (now known and the Southern District Oilers). During the 1990s the club struggled with a shortage of players, coaches and general support. Although they had limited on-field success, the Eagles maintained their competitive spirit and strong sense of pride.

The 2000/01 season was the beginning of a period of re-building for the Eagles. The player roster was boosted by the recruitment of a number of experienced players from other clubs, talented rookies, and significantly, some players from the USA. One of these players, Lloyd Gubler returned to play and coach for three consecutive seasons.

In 2001/02 the Eagles had a record number of registered players for any one team in the league. They made it into the play-offs and 13 Eagles players were selected for the All Star teams. The club also saw the return of Eagles Cheerleaders and a growing number of sponsors and supporters.

Although the 2003/04 season wasn't the best for on field performance, the Eagles were still one of the strongest clubs in the league for player numbers and growing strength in supporters. With their strong presence around the league they had many of our players represent the state at the National Championships held in Adelaide. Along with state representation they also had two players represent Australia.

See also

 South Australian Gridiron Association

References

External links
 

Sporting clubs in Adelaide
American football teams in South Australia
American football teams established in 1986
1986 establishments in Australia